Velp is a Dutch village located east of Arnhem within the municipality of Rheden, between Arnhem, Rozendaal, and the town of Rheden. 

Velp was a separate municipality from 1812 to 1818, when it was merged with Rheden. The municipality also included the village of Rozendaal.

Gallery

Notable residents
 Jan Goossens, former American indoor soccer player.
 Ho-Pin Tung,  Chinese-Dutch auto-racing driver
 René Klaassen, former field hockey defender
 Mina Kruseman, 19th-century feminist and author
 Ella van Heemstra, aristocrat and mother of  Audrey Hepburn
 Audrey Hepburn, 20th-century actress and humanitarian

References

External links

Populated places in Gelderland
Former municipalities of Gelderland
Rheden